Steelyard Commons is a shopping center in Cleveland, Ohio, having opened in 2007.  The center gets its name for having been built on the site of the former LTV Steel Factory #2 in the city's Tremont neighborhood which closed in 2001.  

Tenants include Walmart, Target, Dollar Tree (formerly Deals), Home Depot, Taco Bell, Aldi, Steak n Shake, AT&T, Old Navy, Party City, Burlington Coat Factory, Bath & Body Works, VILLA, Panda Express, fitness center (formerly Best Buy and Halloween shop), Marshalls, Applebee's, IHOP, KeyBank, GameStop, Petco, Burger King, Five Guys and BuyBacks.

Relation to City View 
In 2004 City View Center announced its opening in 2006 and this was also the time the Steelyard Commons was built. The two centers were hand in hand with each other. City View intended to built at the Steelyard commons location but the price was $1.5 million more than former Boyas Dump. This means that City View could be in Cleveland with Steelyards stores. Wal-Mart in City View announced in 2008 it was closing and they merged with Steelyard Commons and Bedford Wal-Mart(now closed) In 2006 Home Depot stated the would be moving to Steelyard instead of City View and Home Depot in Steelyard was originally intended to be 2 stores Big lots and TJ Maxx but Home Depot got to that location before them.

References

Shopping malls established in 2007
2007 establishments in Ohio
Shopping malls in Cuyahoga County, Ohio